Bystrzec  is a  name of non existing village in the administrative district of Gmina Kwidzyn, within Kwidzyn County, Pomeranian Voivodeship, in northern Poland.

For the history of the region, see History of Pomerania.

The village had a population of 170.

References

Bystrzec